Facelina auriculata, sometimes known by the common name Slim Aesop, is a species of sea slug, an aeolid nudibranch in the family Facelinidae.

Facelina coronata (Forbes & Goodsir, 1839) is a synonym of Facelina auriculata.

Distribution
This species occurs in European waters.

References 

 Backeljau, T. (1986). Lijst van de recente mariene mollusken van België [List of the recent marine molluscs of Belgium]. Koninklijk Belgisch Instituut voor Natuurwetenschappen: Brussels, Belgium. 106 pp. 
 Hayward, P.J.; Ryland, J.S. (Ed.) (1990). The marine fauna of the British Isles and North-West Europe: 1. Introduction and protozoans to arthropods. Clarendon Press: Oxford, UK. . 627 pp.
Checklist of species (algae, invertebrates and vertebrates) found in the vicinity of the island of Helgoland (North Sea, German Bight) - a review of recent records. Helgoländer Meeresuntersuch. 47 1: 1-34.
 Gofas, S.; Le Renard, J.; Bouchet, P. (2001). Mollusca, in: Costello, M.J. et al. (Ed.) (2001). European register of marine species: a check-list of the marine species in Europe and a bibliography of guides to their identification. Collection Patrimoines Naturels, 50: pp. 180–213 
 Muller, Y. (2004). Faune et flore du littoral du Nord, du Pas-de-Calais et de la Belgique: inventaire. [Coastal fauna and flora of the Nord, Pas-de-Calais and Belgium: inventory]. Commission Régionale de Biologie Région Nord Pas-de-Calais: France. 307 pp.

External links 
 
 

Facelinidae
Gastropods described in 1776
Taxa named by Otto Friedrich Müller